John Grant (1857 – 19 May 1928) was a Scottish-born Australian politician. Born in Abernethy, he received a primary education before becoming a stonemason. Migrating to Australia in 1880, he became Secretary of the Stonemasons' Union and a founding member of the New South Wales Labor Party. He served as the NSW ALP's General Secretary before his election to the Australian Senate in 1914 as a Labor Senator from New South Wales. Defeated in 1919, he returned to the Senate in 1922, holding the seat until his death in 1928.

References

Australian Labor Party members of the Parliament of Australia
Members of the Australian Senate for New South Wales
Members of the Australian Senate
1857 births
1928 deaths
Australian trade unionists
Australian stonemasons
20th-century Australian politicians